Imsakiah is a schedule that includes all prayer times, Iftar and Suhur, and the number of fasting hours during the day and consider as one of Ramadan appearances in all countries of the world.

History 
The idea of Imsakiah began in Egypt during the reign of the Ottoman Empire, and during the rule of Muhammad Ali of Egypt and two years before his death in the month of Ramadan 1262 AH / 1846 CE. It was first printed in the printing house in Boulaq, Egypt, and it was a yellow paper with 27 cm wide and 17.5 cm long.

References 

Ramadan
Egyptian culture